This is a list of Ole Miss Rebels baseball seasons. The Ole Miss Rebels baseball program is the college baseball team that represents the University of Mississippi in the Western Division of the Southeastern Conference (SEC) in the National Collegiate Athletic Association. Ole Miss plays their home games at Swayze Field in Oxford, Mississippi.

Season results

Notes

Sources:

References

 
Ole Miss
Ole Miss Rebels baseball seasons